America is a parish village in the Dutch province of Limburg, known historically for its peat extraction.

Geography
The town is located within the agricultural Peel region of the Netherlands where peat extraction has been practiced since the Middle Ages.

History
America was founded in the late 19th century on the Venlo–Eindhoven railway to serve peat extraction in the area by providing transportation for workers and resources.  The town's etymology is uncertain, but it is likely the town was named after the Americas.  Other villages with similar foreign names in the Peel region, including California and Siberia, were founded in the same era.

The town's railway station, America Station, opened in 1866 and was rebuilt in 1894.  The parish church for America, Saint Joseph's Church, was completed in 1892.  The railway station closed in 1938 and the town was captured by the Germans during World War II before being liberated by the British on 22 November 1944.  America Station was eventually demolished in 1970, although it has been immortalized by the 1993 album Station America by the local band Rowwen Hèze.

In recent years, as peat extraction has declined surrounding America, reclaimed peatlands have been converted as holiday villages and bungalow resorts including Limburgse Peel and Het Meerdal, both operated by Center Parcs Europe.

Notable people
Hub van Doorne, founder of manufacturing firm DAF
Jack Poels, lead singer of Rowwen Hèze
Joey Litjens, motorcyclist

Gallery

See also
 Amerika, Saxony

References

Populated places in Limburg (Netherlands)
Horst aan de Maas